Haliç University is a foundation university, which was founded in 1998 by the Children Leukemia Foundation in Turkey.

Haliç University offers 21 academic departments in its five faculties, with three schools, the School of Nursing, the School of Physical Education and Sport and the School of Health Sciences and Conservatory.

Student life

University hosts drama, music, visual arts and other cultural events each year. The University has Theatre.

At Haliç University there are more than 30 social, athletic, artistic, and other types of student clubs.

Medical Services

At Haliç University, a business doctor system and infirmary are present, in which two physicians and two nurses work alternately and which meets the sanitary needs of the students, academic and administrative staff in urgent cases. 
The daily medical examination of the students and academic-administrative staff is carried out in the infirmary and immediately required drugs are provided. In emergencies and more serious cases which necessitate further examination patients are sent to the hospitals. Due to a protocol with Vatan Hospital, the patients who consult the hospital through our university are given a 15% reduction of the total expenses.

Undergraduate programs 
 Faculty of Architecture
 Department of Architecture
 Department of Interior Architecture
 Industrial Design
 Faculty of Arts and Sciences
 Department of Molecular Biology and Genetics
 Department of American Culture and Literature
 Psychology
 Translation and Interpretation 
 Department of Applied Mathematics
 Faculty of Engineering
 Department of Biomedical Engineering (English)
 Department of Computer Engineering (English)
 Department of Electrical and Electronics Engineering (English)
 Department of Industrial Engineering (English)
 Department of Mechanical Engineering (English)
 Department of Software Engineering (English)
 Faculty of Business Administration
 Department of Business Administration (Turkish and English)
 Department of Tourism Administration
 Department of International Trade and Business Administration 
 Department of Public Relations and Publicity
 Department of Business Information Systems
 Faculty of Fine Arts
 Department of Graphic Design
 Department of Textile and Fashion Design
 Department of Photography and Video
 Department of Plastic Arts
 School of Nursing
 Department of Nursing 
 School of Health Sciences
 Physical Therapy and Rehabilitation
  Nutrition and Dietetics
 Midwifery
 School of Physical Education and Sport
 Sports Management  
 Coaching Education  
 Recreation 
 Conservatory
 Department of Turkish Music
 Theatre
Faculty of Medicine
Medicine

Graduate (master) programs 
 Institute of Natural Sciences  
 Management Information Systems
 Industrial Engineering
 Electronics and Communication Engineering
 Interior Architecture
 Architecture
 Molecular Biology and Genetics
 Computer Engineering
 Applied Mathematics
 Institute of Social Sciences
 Traditional Turkish Music (graduate)
 Traditional Turkish Music (proficiency in Art)
 Psychology
 Drama
 Tourism Administration
 Business Administration
 Textile and Fashion Design
 Graphic Design
  Institute of Health Sciences
  Nursing

Student activities - Student Clubs 

Sports Clubs

Performance Sports

Soccer
Basketball
Handball

Nature Sports

Mountaineering
Law salvage
Orienteering
Mountain Biking

Activities

Ski
Scuba-Diving
Swimming
Sailing
Amateur sea training
Tennis
Horse riding

Fine Arts Clubs

Acting
Music
Photography
Documentary and Short movies
Dancing

Tourism and Green Environment Clubs

Unifriends
Tourism, culture and arts

Psychology Club

Eastern Sports Clubs

Aikido
Kyudo
Kendo
Kick Box
Tai Chi
Yoga

Science and Technical Clubs

Business
Architecture
Communication

Electronic communication Club

Computer Club

Sport trophies between 2006-2009 

Universities Cup - Category C Volleyball Group 1st place 
March 23 - April 3, 2009
Place: Okan University, Women Team I.

Universities Cup - Soccer Category A 1st place 
April 18–22, 2006 
Place: Bartın, Men Team II.	

Universities Cup - Soccer Category B 1st place in groups 
March 27 - April 11, 2006 
Place: İstanbul, Men team I.	

İstanbul Golf Club - İstanbul Cup, Men Category 2008 3rd place Melih Okyar	
1st Place Men Eindhoven, The Netherlands 
2–9 July 2006	

2nd Avea - Kempinski Pro-Am Golf Tournament Winning Team Day I PGA Sultan Course	
4th Theatre Festival between universities 
May 22–26, 2006
Best Play- 2nd place	

5th European Soccer Cup between universities 2nd cup	
5th European Universities Football Championship Rome 
July 9–15, 2007	

6th Turkish universities sports tournament – Soccer, Category A 1st place 
April 23–30, 2008 
Place: Muğla, Marmaris Team I.	

20 km Endurance horse riding competition – 1st place Yaman Gedikoglu
April 28, 2007	

Boğaziçi University Sports Fest 2006 Soccer Men 1st place	
Soccer – Category A, 1st place 
May 5–9, 2007 
Place: Marmara University, Team I.	

KOÇ FEST- Universities Festival
Final Men Basketball I. 
May 20–22, 2009 
Place: İzmir	

KOÇ FEST- Basketball Tournament between Turkish Universities
April 7-May 1, 2009 
Place: Ondokuz Mayıs University, Men Team I.	

KupaSU 2006 Sports Festival Champion	
Universities Soccer Tournament 2nd Division 1st place in groups - Team II
March 24-April 4, 2006	
Place: Istanbul

References

Universities and colleges in Istanbul
Private universities and colleges in Turkey
Educational institutions established in 1998
1998 establishments in Turkey